The 1988 Philadelphia Phillies season was a season in Major League Baseball. The Phillies finished sixth in the National League East with a record of 65 wins and 96 losses.

Offseason
 December 9, 1987: Glenn Wilson, Mike Jackson, and Dave Brundage (minors) were traded by the Phillies to the Seattle Mariners for Phil Bradley and Tim Fortugno.
 March 21, 1988: Rick Schu, Keith Hughes and Jeff Stone were traded by the Phillies to the Baltimore Orioles for Mike Young and a player to be named later. The Orioles completed the deal by sending Frank Bellino (minors) to the Phillies on June 14.

Regular season
The Phillies were scheduled to play the Cubs in the first night game at Wrigley Field on August 8, 1988. The game began before an announced crowd of 39,008. The Cubs were leading 3 to 1 and coming to bat in the bottom of the fourth when the rain delay began. The umpires called the game after waiting two hours, ten minutes. The Cubs' first official night game came the following night against the Mets.

Montreal Expos pitcher Pascual Pérez threw a five-inning rain-shortened no-hitter against the Phillies on September 24, 1988. It was the first no-hitter in Veterans Stadium history. Perez allowed one walk, and another Phillies baserunner reached on an error. Umpire Harry Wendelstedt waved off the game after a 90-minute rain delay after the game was stopped by a steady rain with one out in the top of the sixth. However, due to a statistical rule change in 1991, no-hitters must last at least nine innings to count. As a result of the retroactive application of the new rule, this game and thirty-five others are no longer considered no-hitters.

Season standings

Record vs. opponents

Notable transactions
 April 1, 1988: Greg A. Harris was signed as a free agent by the Phillies.
 June 1, 1988: Tim Mauser was drafted by the Phillies in the 3rd round of the 1988 Major League Baseball draft.
July 15, 1988: Luis Aguayo was traded by the Philadelphia Phillies to the New York Yankees for Amalio Carreno.

1988 Game Log

|- style="background:#fbb"
| 1 || April 5 || Pirates || 3–5 || Mike Dunne (1–0) || Shane Rawley (0–1) || Jeff Robinson (1) || 46,394 || 0–1
|- style="background:#bfb"
| 2 || April 6 || Pirates || 6–5 (14) || Mike Maddux (1–0) || Bob Kipper (0–1) || None || 15,532 || 1–1
|- style="background:#bbb"
| – || April 7 || Pirates || colspan=6 | Postponed (rain); Makeup: August 12 as a traditional double-header
|- style="background:#bfb"
| 3 || April 8 || Mets || 5–1 || Bruce Ruffin (1–0) || Sid Fernandez (0–1) || None || 21,921 || 2–1
|- style="background:#bfb"
| 4 || April 9 || Mets || 9–3 || Don Carman (1–0) || Rick Aguilera (0–1) || None || 30,994 || 3–1
|- style="background:#fbb"
| 5 || April 10 || Mets || 3–4 || Dwight Gooden (2–0) || Shane Rawley (0–2) || Randy Myers (2) || 51,781 || 3–2
|- style="background:#fbb"
| 6 || April 11 || @ Pirates || 1–5 || Doug Drabek (1–0) || Kevin Gross (0–1) || None || 54,089 || 3–3
|- style="background:#fbb"
| 7 || April 13 || @ Pirates || 0–7 || Brian Fisher (2–0) || Bruce Ruffin (1–1) || None || 9,825 || 3–4
|- style="background:#fbb"
| 8 || April 14 || @ Pirates || 2–4 || Bob Walk (1–1) || Don Carman (1–1) || Jeff Robinson (3) || 6,222 || 3–5
|- style="background:#fbb"
| 9 || April 15 || @ Expos || 4–6 || Andy McGaffigan (1–0) || Todd Frohwirth (0–1) || Tim Burke (1) || 11,292 || 3–6
|- style="background:#fbb"
| 10 || April 16 || @ Expos || 1–2 (10) || Tim Burke (1–0) || Kent Tekulve (0–1) || None || 13,664 || 3–7
|- style="background:#fbb"
| 11 || April 17 || @ Expos || 2–5 || Pascual Pérez (2–1) || Bill Dawley (0–1) || Andy McGaffigan (1) || 16,597 || 3–8
|- style="background:#bfb"
| 12 || April 18 || @ Mets || 10–7 || Bruce Ruffin (2–1) || Rick Aguilera (0–2) || None || 14,931 || 4–8
|- style="background:#bfb"
| 13 || April 19 || @ Mets || 10–2 || Don Carman (2–1) || Bob Ojeda (2–1) || None || 24,555 || 5–8
|- style="background:#fbb"
| 14 || April 20 || @ Mets || 2–6 || Dwight Gooden (4–0) || Shane Rawley (0–3) || None || 27,714 || 5–9
|- style="background:#bfb"
| 15 || April 22 || Expos || 2–0 || Kevin Gross (1–1) || Pascual Pérez (2–2) || None || 22,113 || 6–9
|- style="background:#fffdd0"
| 16 || April 23 || Expos || 3–3 (7) || None || None || None || 23,394 || 6–9–1
|- style="background:#fbb"
| 17 || April 24 || Expos || 1–3 || Dennis Martínez (3–2) || Don Carman (2–2) || Tim Burke (3) || 47,917 || 6–10–1
|- style="background:#fbb"
| 18 || April 26 || @ Astros || 1–3 || Mike Scott (4–0) || Shane Rawley (0–4) || Dave Smith (3) || 13,152 || 6–11–1
|- style="background:#fbb"
| 19 || April 27 || @ Astros || 2–3 (10) || Dave Smith (1–1) || Kent Tekulve (0–2) || None || 14,462 || 6–12–1
|- style="background:#bbb"
| – || April 29 || Braves || colspan=6 | Postponed (rain); Makeup: July 18 as a traditional double-header
|- style="background:#bfb"
| 20 || April 30 || Braves || 7–5 || Don Carman (3–2) || Rick Mahler (0–3) || Kent Tekulve (1) || 19,138 || 7–12–1
|-

|- style="background:#fbb"
| 21 || May 1 || Braves || 5–9 || Tom Glavine (1–3) || Shane Rawley (0–5) || None || 42,491 || 7–13–1
|- style="background:#bfb"
| 22 || May 2 || Astros || 7–1 || Kevin Gross (2–1) || Nolan Ryan (2–2) || None || 18,931 || 8–13–1
|- style="background:#fbb"
| 23 || May 3 || Astros || 0–4 || Bob Knepper (3–0) || Bruce Ruffin (2–2) || None || 16,443 || 8–14–1
|- style="background:#fbb"
| 24 || May 4 || @ Reds || 1–3 || Danny Jackson (4–1) || David Palmer (0–1) || None || 14,302 || 8–15–1
|- style="background:#fbb"
| 25 || May 5 || @ Reds || 4–10 || José Rijo (4–1) || Bill Dawley (0–2) || None || 18,017 || 8–16–1
|- style="background:#bfb"
| 26 || May 6 || @ Braves || 7–3 || Shane Rawley (1–5) || Tom Glavine (1–4) || None || 8,377 || 9–16–1
|- style="background:#fbb"
| 27 || May 7 || @ Braves || 5–6 || Paul Assenmacher (1–2) || Kent Tekulve (0–3) || None || 15,578 || 9–17–1
|- style="background:#bfb"
| 28 || May 8 || @ Braves || 5–1 || Bruce Ruffin (3–2) || Pete Smith (1–3) || None || 11,232 || 10–17–1
|- style="background:#fbb"
| 29 || May 9 || Reds || 0–2 || Danny Jackson (4–1) || David Palmer (0–2) || None || 19,303 || 10–18–1
|- style="background:#fbb"
| 30 || May 10 || Reds || 1–10 || Tom Browning (1–0) || Don Carman (3–3) || None || 22,626 || 10–19–1
|- style="background:#bfb"
| 31 || May 11 || Reds || 4–3 (11) || Kent Tekulve (1–3) || John Franco (0–3) || None || 21,640 || 11–19–1
|- style="background:#bfb"
| 32 || May 13 || @ Dodgers || 2–1 || Kevin Gross (3–1) || Tim Leary (2–3) || Kent Tekulve (2) || 38,015 || 12–19–1
|- style="background:#fbb"
| 33 || May 14 || @ Dodgers || 2–3 || Don Sutton (3–2) || Bruce Ruffin (3–3) || Jay Howell (3) || 47,379 || 12–20–1
|- style="background:#fbb"
| 34 || May 15 || @ Dodgers || 2–9 || Tim Belcher (3–1) || David Palmer (0–3) || None || 41,045 || 12–21–1
|- style="background:#bfb"
| 35 || May 16 || @ Giants || 3–0 || Shane Rawley (2–5) || Rick Reuschel (5–2) || None || 6,278 || 13–21–1
|- style="background:#bfb"
| 36 || May 17 || @ Giants || 8–1 || Kevin Gross (4–1) || Kelly Downs (1–4) || None || 9,948 || 14–21–1
|- style="background:#fbb"
| 37 || May 18 || @ Giants || 1–5 || Mike Krukow (3–2) || Bruce Ruffin (3–4) || Scott Garrelts (2) || 12,940 || 14–22–1
|- style="background:#fbb"
| 38 || May 20 || @ Padres || 3–4 || Mark Davis (2–3) || Kent Tekulve (1–4) || None || 10,208 || 14–23–1
|- style="background:#bfb"
| 39 || May 21 || @ Padres || 4–3 || Shane Rawley (3–5) || Mark Grant (0–4) || Steve Bedrosian (1) || 15,572 || 15–23–1
|- style="background:#fbb"
| 40 || May 22 || @ Padres || 2–9 || Eric Show (3–4) || Kevin Gross (4–2) || None || 40,012 || 15–24–1
|- style="background:#fbb"
| 41 || May 24 || Dodgers || 1–2 (12) || Alejandro Peña (2–1) || Greg A. Harris (0–1) || Jesse Orosco (4) || 17,759 || 15–25–1
|- style="background:#fbb"
| 42 || May 25 || Dodgers || 0–4 || Tim Leary (4–3) || David Palmer (0–4) || None || 24,444 || 15–26–1
|- style="background:#fbb"
| 43 || May 26 || Dodgers || 8–10 || Jay Howell (2–0) || Steve Bedrosian (0–1) || None || 19,361 || 15–27–1
|- style="background:#bfb"
| 44 || May 27 || Giants || 5–2 || Kevin Gross (5–2) || Kelly Downs (2–5) || Steve Bedrosian (2) || 24,038 || 16–27–1
|- style="background:#bfb"
| 45 || May 28 || Giants || 4–3 (10) || Greg A. Harris (1–1) || Randy Bockus (0–1) || None || 25,784 || 17–27–1
|- style="background:#bfb"
| 46 || May 29 || Giants || 4–2 || Bruce Ruffin (4–4) || Mike Krukow (4–3) || Steve Bedrosian (3) || 40,276 || 18–27–1
|- style="background:#bfb"
| 47 || May 30 || Padres || 7–3 || Shane Rawley (4–5) || Ed Whitson (3–5) || None || 17,910 || 19–27–1
|- style="background:#fbb"
| 48 || May 31 || Padres || 0–8 || Andy Hawkins (5–4) || David Palmer (0–5) || None || 16,733 || 19–28–1
|-

|- style="background:#bfb"
| 49 || June 1 || Padres || 9–7 || Kent Tekulve (2–4) || Lance McCullers (0–4) || Greg A. Harris (1) || 16,270 || 20–28–1
|- style="background:#fbb"
| 50 || June 2 || Cardinals || 2–3 (14) || John Costello (1–0) || Danny Clay (0–1) || None || 20,210 || 20–29–1
|- style="background:#fbb"
| 51 || June 3 || Cardinals || 4–5 (10) || Todd Worrell (3–2) || Greg A. Harris (1–2) || None || 26,836 || 20–30–1
|- style="background:#fbb"
| 52 || June 4 || Cardinals || 1–8 || Cris Carpenter (2–0) || Shane Rawley (4–6) || None || 34,081 || 20–31–1
|- style="background:#bfb"
| 53 || June 5 || Cardinals || 6–3 || David Palmer (1–5) || Randy O'Neal (2–3) || Steve Bedrosian (4) || 43,429 || 21–31–1
|- style="background:#bfb"
| 54 || June 6 || @ Expos || 5–4 || Kevin Gross (6–2) || Floyd Youmans (1–5) || Steve Bedrosian (5) || 12,127 || 22–31–1
|- style="background:#bfb"
| 55 || June 7 || @ Expos || 10–5 || Greg A. Harris (2–2) || Neal Heaton (2–4) || Kent Tekulve (3) || 11,556 || 23–31–1
|- style="background:#fbb"
| 56 || June 8 || @ Expos || 4–5 (10) || Jeff Parrett (5–1) || Steve Bedrosian (0–2) || None || 10,214 || 23–32–1
|- style="background:#bfb"
| 57 || June 10 || @ Pirates || 12–10 || Greg A. Harris (3–2) || Jeff Robinson (3–2) || Steve Bedrosian (6) || 20,001 || 24–32–1
|- style="background:#fbb"
| 58 || June 11 || @ Pirates || 2–8 || Mike Dunne (4–4) || David Palmer (1–6) || None || 19,926 || 24–33–1
|- style="background:#bfb"
| 59 || June 12 || @ Pirates || 5–4 || Kevin Gross (7–2) || Brian Fisher (4–4) || Steve Bedrosian (7) || 36,134 || 25–33–1
|- style="background:#bfb"
| 60 || June 13 || Expos || 5–2 || Shane Rawley (5–6) || Neal Heaton (2–5) || None || 20,544 || 26–33–1
|- style="background:#fbb"
| 61 || June 14 (1) || Expos || 0–9 || Dennis Martínez (7–6) || Bruce Ruffin (4–5) || None || see 2nd game || 26–34–1
|- style="background:#bfb"
| 62 || June 14 (2) || Expos || 4–2 || Don Carman (4–3) || John Dopson (1–4) || Steve Bedrosian (8) || 24,082 || 27–34–1
|- style="background:#bfb"
| 63 || June 15 || Expos || 6–2 || David Palmer (2–6) || Floyd Youmans (2–6) || Steve Bedrosian (9) || 23,553 || 28–34–1
|- style="background:#bfb"
| 64 || June 17 || @ Mets || 3–1 || Kevin Gross (8–2) || Dwight Gooden (9–3) || Steve Bedrosian (10) || 46,502 || 29–34–1
|- style="background:#fbb"
| 65 || June 18 || @ Mets || 2–3 (14) || Terry Leach (2–1) || Todd Frohwirth (0–2) || None || 49,307 || 29–35–1
|- style="background:#fbb"
| 66 || June 19 || @ Mets || 0–6 || David Cone (8–1) || Don Carman (4–4) || None || 46,773 || 29–36–1
|- style="background:#fbb"
| 67 || June 20 || Cubs || 2–7 || Jamie Moyer (4–7) || Bruce Ruffin (4–6) || None || 26,616 || 29–37–1
|- style="background:#bfb"
| 68 || June 21 || Cubs || 6–1 || David Palmer (3–6) || Jeff Pico (2–2) || None || 25,478 || 30–37–1
|- style="background:#bfb"
| 69 || June 22 || Cubs || 5–3 || Todd Frohwirth (1–2) || Rick Sutcliffe (5–5) || Steve Bedrosian (11) || 27,322 || 31–37–1
|- style="background:#fbb"
| 70 || June 23 || @ Cardinals || 0–2 || John Tudor (4–2) || Shane Rawley (5–7) || None || 36,176 || 31–38–1
|- style="background:#bfb"
| 71 || June 24 || @ Cardinals || 7–6 || Bruce Ruffin (5–6) || Todd Worrell (3–3) || Steve Bedrosian (12) || 41,332 || 32–38–1
|- style="background:#fbb"
| 72 || June 25 || @ Cardinals || 1–4 || José DeLeón (5–5) || Kevin Gross (8–3) || None || 44,214 || 32–39–1
|- style="background:#bfb"
| 73 || June 26 || @ Cardinals || 7–5 (10) || Steve Bedrosian (1–2) || Larry McWilliams (4–3) || Bruce Ruffin (1) || 38,237 || 33–39–1
|- style="background:#fbb"
| 74 || June 27 || @ Cubs || 1–2 || Rick Sutcliffe (6–5) || Shane Rawley (5–8) || Al Nipper (1) || 27,945 || 33–40–1
|- style="background:#fbb"
| 75 || June 28 || @ Cubs || 4–6 || Mike Capel (2–1) || Steve Bedrosian (1–3) || Les Lancaster (3) || 32,271 || 33–41–1
|- style="background:#bfb"
| 76 || June 29 || @ Cubs || 4–2 || Mike Maddux (2–0) || Calvin Schiraldi (4–6) || Steve Bedrosian (13) || 30,812 || 34–41–1
|-

|- style="background:#fbb"
| 77 || July 1 || Reds || 3–5 || Tom Browning (7–3) || Shane Rawley (5–9) || John Franco (10) || 56,502 || 34–42–1
|- style="background:#bfb"
| 78 || July 2 || Reds || 5–3 || David Palmer (4–6) || Jack Armstrong (0–3) || Steve Bedrosian (14) || 25,122 || 35–42–1
|- style="background:#fbb"
| 79 || July 3 || Reds || 2–3 || Danny Jackson (9–4) || Kevin Gross (8–4) || None || 41,899 || 35–43–1
|- style="background:#fbb"
| 80 || July 4 || @ Braves || 0–7 || Pete Smith (3–8) || Don Carman (4–5) || None || 23,921 || 35–44–1
|- style="background:#fbb"
| 81 || July 5 || @ Braves || 5–10 || Jose Alvarez (3–2) || Bruce Ruffin (5–7) || None || 5,471 || 35–45–1
|- style="background:#fbb"
| 82 || July 6 || @ Braves || 2–3 || Zane Smith (4–6) || Shane Rawley (5–10) || Bruce Sutter (12) || 6,537 || 35–46–1
|- style="background:#fbb"
| 83 || July 7 || @ Reds || 2–5 || Danny Jackson (10–4) || Kevin Gross (8–5) || John Franco (12) || 31,910 || 35–47–1
|- style="background:#bfb"
| 84 || July 8 || @ Reds || 1–0 || Don Carman (5–5) || José Rijo (9–4) || Steve Bedrosian (15) || 30,811 || 36–47–1
|- style="background:#fbb"
| 85 || July 9 || @ Reds || 3–6 || Rob Dibble (1–0) || Kent Tekulve (2–5) || John Franco (13) || 29,473 || 36–48–1
|- style="background:#fbb"
| 86 || July 10 || @ Reds || 4–5 || Jack Armstrong (1–3) || Shane Rawley (5–11) || John Franco (14) || 29,142 || 36–49–1
|- style="background:#bbcaff;"
| – || July 12 ||colspan="7" |1988 Major League Baseball All-Star Game at Riverfront Stadium in Cincinnati
|- style="background:#fbb"
| 87 || July 14 || Astros || 5–7 || Juan Agosto (7–0) || Kent Tekulve (2–6) || Dave Smith (15) || 24,302 || 36–50–1
|- style="background:#fbb"
| 88 || July 15 || Astros || 2–5 || Jim Deshaies (6–6) || Kevin Gross (8–6) || Danny Darwin (1) || 26,545 || 36–51–1
|- style="background:#bfb"
| 89 || July 16 || Astros || 10–6 || Bruce Ruffin (6–7) || Danny Darwin (3–9) || None || 32,871 || 37–51–1
|- style="background:#bfb"
| 90 || July 17 || Astros || 10–4 || Kent Tekulve (3–6) || Bob Knepper (9–3) || None || 28,149 || 38–51–1
|- style="background:#fbb"
| 91 || July 18 (1) || Braves || 8–9 (11) || Charlie Puleo (2–3) || Bruce Ruffin (6–8) || None || see 2nd game || 38–52–1
|- style="background:#bfb"
| 92 || July 18 (2) || Braves || 4–1 || David Palmer (5–6) || Germán Jiménez (0–3) || Steve Bedrosian (16) || 22,066 || 39–52–1
|- style="background:#bfb"
| 93 || July 19 || Braves || 6–4 || Kevin Gross (9–6) || Zane Smith (4–7) || Steve Bedrosian (17) || 19,735 || 40–52–1
|- style="background:#bfb"
| 94 || July 20 || Braves || 4–3 || Don Carman (6–5) || Pete Smith (3–10) || Steve Bedrosian (18) || 17,747 || 41–52–1
|- style="background:#fbb"
| 95 || July 21 || @ Astros || 0–2 || Nolan Ryan (7–7) || Mike Maddux (2–1) || None || 29,654 || 41–53–1
|- style="background:#fbb"
| 96 || July 22 || @ Astros || 3–5 || Bob Knepper (10–3) || David Palmer (5–7) || Danny Darwin (3) || 40,922 || 41–54–1
|- style="background:#fbb"
| 97 || July 23 || @ Astros || 6–7 || Dave Smith (4–5) || Steve Bedrosian (1–4) || None || 32,931 || 41–55–1
|- style="background:#bfb"
| 98 || July 24 || @ Astros || 6–4 || Kevin Gross (10–6) || Mike Scott (9–3) || Steve Bedrosian (19) || 25,811 || 42–55–1
|- style="background:#bfb"
| 99 || July 25 || Mets || 3–2 || Don Carman (7–5) || Ron Darling (10–7) || Bruce Ruffin (2) || 42,701 || 43–55–1
|- style="background:#fbb"
| 100 || July 26 || Mets || 5–7 || Terry Leach (4–1) || Greg A. Harris (3–3) || Randy Myers (15) || 34,192 || 43–56–1
|- style="background:#fbb"
| 101 || July 27 || Mets || 2–10 || Dwight Gooden (13–5) || David Palmer (5–8) || None || 36,016 || 43–57–1
|- style="background:#fbb"
| 102 || July 28 || Cubs || 0–7 || Calvin Schiraldi (6–8) || Shane Rawley (5–12) || None || 23,767 || 43–58–1
|- style="background:#fbb"
| 103 || July 29 || Cubs || 3–8 || Rick Sutcliffe (8–9) || Kevin Gross (10–7) || None || 25,118 || 43–59–1
|- style="background:#bfb"
| 104 || July 30 || Cubs || 3–2 || Don Carman (8–5) || Al Nipper (1–4) || Steve Bedrosian (20) || 24,625 || 44–59–1
|- style="background:#bfb"
| 105 || July 31 || Cubs || 6–3 || Mike Maddux (3–1) || Greg Maddux (15–5) || Bruce Ruffin (3) || 35,066 || 45–59–1
|-

|- style="background:#bfb"
| 106 || August 2 || @ Cardinals || 2–0 || David Palmer (6–8) || Joe Magrane (1–5) || None || 27,744 || 46–59–1
|- style="background:#fbb"
| 107 || August 3 || @ Cardinals || 2–4 || Bob Forsch (5–3) || Kevin Gross (10–8) || Scott Terry (3) || 23,277 || 46–60–1
|- style="background:#fbb"
| 108 || August 4 || @ Cardinals || 2–9 || José DeLeón (8–8) || Shane Rawley (5–13) || None || 23,955 || 46–61–1
|- style="background:#bfb"
| 109 || August 5 || @ Cubs || 9–3 || Don Carman (9–5) || Greg Maddux (15–6) || None || 28,801 || 47–61–1
|- style="background:#fbb"
| 110 || August 6 || @ Cubs || 4–7 || Al Nipper (2–4) || Mike Maddux (3–2) || Rich Gossage (11) || 32,057 || 47–62–1
|- style="background:#bfb"
| 111 || August 7 || @ Cubs || 7–4 || David Palmer (7–8) || Jamie Moyer (5–11) || Steve Bedrosian (21) || 31,350 || 48–62–1
|- style="background:#bbb"
| – || August 8 || @ Cubs || colspan=6 | (Was to have been the 1st MLB night game at Wrigley Field) Postponed (rain); Makeup: September 5 as a traditional double-header
|- style="background:#fbb"
| 112 || August 9 || Cardinals || 3–7 || Dan Quisenberry (2–1) || Steve Bedrosian (1–5) || None || 25,533 || 48–63–1
|- style="background:#fbb"
| 113 || August 10 || Cardinals || 0–1 || John Tudor (6–5) || Don Carman (9–6) || Todd Worrell (22) || 24,837 || 48–64–1
|- style="background:#bfb"
| 114 || August 11 || Cardinals || 1–0 || Steve Bedrosian (2–5) || John Costello (3–1) || None || 25,607 || 49–64–1
|- style="background:#bfb"
| 115 || August 12 (1) || Pirates || 9–1 || Kevin Gross (11–8) || Mike Dunne (6–9) || None || see 2nd game || 50–64–1
|- style="background:#bfb"
| 116 || August 12 (2) || Pirates || 6–4 || Steve Bedrosian (3–5) || Bob Kipper (2–4) || None || 37,673 || 51–64–1
|- style="background:#fbb"
| 117 || August 13 || Pirates || 4–10 || Jeff Robinson (9–2) || Greg A. Harris (3–4) || None || 35,432 || 51–65–1
|- style="background:#fbb"
| 118 || August 14 || Pirates || 8–9 || Jim Gott (6–4) || Steve Bedrosian (3–6) || None || 36,468 || 51–66–1
|- style="background:#fbb"
| 119 || August 16 || @ Dodgers || 5–7 || Tim Leary (13–8) || Don Carman (9–7) || Jay Howell (15) || 32,482 || 51–67–1
|- style="background:#fbb"
| 120 || August 17 || @ Dodgers || 2–7 || John Tudor (7–5) || Mike Maddux (3–3) || None || 42,701 || 51–68–1
|- style="background:#fbb"
| 121 || August 18 || @ Dodgers || 1–2 || Jay Howell (3–3) || Kevin Gross (11–9) || Jesse Orosco (8) || 34,467 || 51–69–1
|- style="background:#fbb"
| 122 || August 19 || @ Giants || 2–6 || Kelly Downs (13–9) || Bruce Ruffin (6–9) || Scott Garrelts (12) || 14,721 || 51–70–1
|- style="background:#fbb"
| 123 || August 20 || @ Giants || 3–4 || Don Robinson (5–3) || Marvin Freeman (0–1) || Scott Garrelts (13) || 26,818 || 51–71–1
|- style="background:#fbb"
| 124 || August 21 || @ Giants || 3–6 || Atlee Hammaker (7–5) || Don Carman (9–8) || Lary Sorensen (1) || 31,820 || 51–72–1
|- style="background:#bfb"
| 125 || August 22 || @ Padres || 6–5 || Greg A. Harris (4–4) || Jimmy Jones (8–11) || Steve Bedrosian (22) || 20,577 || 52–72–1
|- style="background:#fbb"
| 126 || August 23 || @ Padres || 1–9 || Ed Whitson (11–8) || Kevin Gross (11–10) || None || 10,535 || 52–73–1
|- style="background:#fbb"
| 127 || August 24 || @ Padres || 2–5 || Eric Show (11–10) || David Palmer (7–9) || None || 14,632 || 52–74–1
|- style="background:#fbb"
| 128 || August 26 || Dodgers || 2–7 || Tim Belcher (10–4) || Marvin Freeman (0–2) || None || 27,533 || 52–75–1
|- style="background:#fbb"
| 129 || August 27 || Dodgers || 2–4 || Tim Leary (15–8) || Don Carman (9–9) || Jay Howell (16) || 27,324 || 52–76–1
|- style="background:#fbb"
| 130 || August 28 || Dodgers || 0–5 || John Tudor (8–6) || Kevin Gross (11–11) || None || 28,570 || 52–77–1
|- style="background:#bfb"
| 131 || August 29 || Giants || 3–0 || Shane Rawley (6–13) || Atlee Hammaker (7–6) || Steve Bedrosian (23) || 16,854 || 53–77–1
|- style="background:#bfb"
| 132 || August 30 || Giants || 7–5 || Steve Bedrosian (4–6) || Craig Lefferts (2–8) || None || 24,730 || 54–77–1
|- style="background:#fbb"
| 133 || August 31 || Giants || 2–3 (11) || Scott Garrelts (5–7) || Bruce Ruffin (6–10) || None || 23,233 || 54–78–1
|-

|- style="background:#fbb"
| 134 || September 2 || Padres || 4–7 || Jimmy Jones (9–12) || Don Carman (9–10) || Mark Davis (25) || 15,384 || 54–79–1
|- style="background:#fbb"
| 135 || September 3 || Padres || 2–5 || Ed Whitson (12–8) || Kevin Gross (11–12) || None || 16,315 || 54–80–1
|- style="background:#bbb"
| – || September 4 || Padres || colspan=6 | Cancelled (rain); Was not rescheduled
|- style="background:#fbb"
| 136 || September 5 (1) || @ Cubs || 3–14 || Rick Sutcliffe (12–11) || Bob Sebra (0–1) || None || see 2nd game || 54–81–1
|- style="background:#bfb"
| 137 || September 5 (2) || @ Cubs || 4–3 || Shane Rawley (7–13) || Scott Sanderson (1–1) || Steve Bedrosian (24) || 27,084 || 55–81–1
|- style="background:#bfb"
| 138 || September 6 || @ Cubs || 3–2 || Marvin Freeman (1–2) || Jamie Moyer (7–14) || Steve Bedrosian (25) || 23,189 || 56–81–1
|- style="background:#fbb"
| 139 || September 7 || @ Cardinals || 0–5 || Joe Magrane (4–8) || Don Carman (9–11) || None || 23,535 || 56–82–1
|- style="background:#fbb"
| 140 || September 8 || @ Cardinals || 0–1 || Larry McWilliams (5–6) || Kevin Gross (11–13) || Todd Worrell (28) || 19,211 || 56–83–1
|- style="background:#fbb"
| 141 || September 9 || @ Pirates || 2–5 || Mike Dunne (7–11) || Bob Sebra (0–2) || Jim Gott (28) || 15,446 || 56–84–1
|- style="background:#fbb"
| 142 || September 10 || @ Pirates || 1–5 || Dave LaPoint (14–11) || Shane Rawley (7–14) || None || 27,804 || 56–85–1
|- style="background:#bfb"
| 143 || September 11 || @ Pirates || 7–4 || Marvin Freeman (2–2) || John Smiley (11–10) || None || 18,132 || 57–85–1
|- style="background:#bfb"
| 144 || September 12 || Cubs || 5–1 || Don Carman (10–11) || Jamie Moyer (7–15) || Kent Tekulve (4) || 13,433 || 58–85–1
|- style="background:#fbb"
| 145 || September 13 || Cubs || 2–9 || Greg Maddux (17–7) || Kevin Gross (11–14) || None || 13,301 || 58–86–1
|- style="background:#bfb"
| 146 || September 14 || Cardinals || 9–2 || Bob Sebra (1–2) || Greg Mathews (4–6) || None || 13,829 || 59–86–1
|- style="background:#fbb"
| 147 || September 15 || Cardinals || 1–3 || Scott Terry (9–3) || Shane Rawley (7–15) || Todd Worrell (30) || 10,434 || 59–87–1
|- style="background:#fbb"
| 148 || September 16 || Pirates || 5–7 || Jeff Robinson (10–5) || Greg A. Harris (4–5) || Jim Gott (30) || 17,446 || 59–88–1
|- style="background:#fbb"
| 149 || September 17 || Pirates || 2–7 || Doug Drabek (15–6) || Don Carman (10–12) || Jeff Robinson (9) || 14,528 || 59–89–1
|- style="background:#bfb"
| 150 || September 18 || Pirates || 6–5 (10) || Steve Bedrosian (5–6) || Randy Kramer (0–1) || None || 21,282 || 60–89–1
|- style="background:#fbb"
| 151 || September 20 || @ Mets || 4–6 || David Cone (18–3) || Shane Rawley (7–16) || None || 30,337 || 60–90–1
|- style="background:#fbb"
| 152 || September 21 || @ Mets || 3–4 || Sid Fernandez (10–10) || Marvin Freeman (2–3) || Randy Myers (24) || 35,450 || 60–91–1
|- style="background:#fbb"
| 153 || September 22 || @ Mets || 1–3 || Ron Darling (16–9) || Don Carman (10–13) || None || 45,274 || 60–92–1
|- style="background:#fbb"
| 154 || September 23 || Expos || 2–3 || Jeff Parrett (12–3) || Kent Tekulve (3–7) || Tim Burke (16) || 13,386 || 60–93–1
|- style="background:#fbb"
| 155 || September 24 || Expos || 0–1 (6) || Pascual Pérez (12–7) || Alex Madrid (0–1) || None || 14,088 || 60–94–1
|- style="background:#bfb"
| 156 || September 25 || Expos || 8–5 || Shane Rawley (8–16) || Dennis Martínez (15–13) || Steve Bedrosian (26) || 20,188 || 61–94–1
|- style="background:#fbb"
| 157 || September 26 || Mets || 4–10 || Sid Fernandez (11–10) || Greg A. Harris (4–6) || None || 20,694 || 61–95–1
|- style="background:#bfb"
| 158 || September 27 || Mets || 5–4 || Steve Bedrosian (6–6) || Roger McDowell (5–5) || None || 19,259 || 62–95–1
|- style="background:#bfb"
| 159 || September 28 || Mets || 9–3 || Kevin Gross (12–14) || Dwight Gooden (18–9) || None || 20,914 || 63–95–1
|- style="background:#bfb"
| 160 || September 30 || @ Expos || 2–1 || Alex Madrid (1–1) || Pascual Pérez (12–8) || Steve Bedrosian (27) || 7,362 || 64–95–1
|-

|- style="background:#bfb"
| 161 || October 1 || @ Expos || 5–4 || Mike Maddux (4–3) || Jeff Parrett (12–4) || Steve Bedrosian (28) || 9,105 || 65–95–1
|- style="background:#fbb"
| 162 || October 2 || @ Expos || 1–3 || Brian Holman (4–8) || Don Carman' (10–14) || Joe Hesketh (9) || 13,498 || 65–96–1
|-

Roster

Player stats

Batting

Starters by positionNote: Pos = Position; G = Games played; AB = At bats; H = Hits; Avg. = Batting average; HR = Home runs; RBI = Runs batted inOther battersNote: G = Games played; AB = At bats; H = Hits; Avg. = Batting average; HR = Home runs; RBI = Runs batted inPitching

Starting pitchersNote: G = Games pitched; IP = Innings pitched; W = Wins; L = Losses; ERA = Earned run average; SO = StrikeoutsOther pitchersNote: G = Games pitched; IP = Innings pitched; W = Wins; L = Losses; ERA = Earned run average; SO = StrikeoutsRelief pitchersNote: G = Games pitched; W = Wins; L = Losses; SV = Saves; ERA = Earned run average; SO = Strikeouts Farm system 

LEAGUE CHAMPIONS: Spartanburg

Notes

References
1988 Philadelphia Phillies season at Baseball Reference''

Philadelphia Phillies seasons
Philadelphia Phillies season
Philadelphia